Hayden James Doyle (born 25 February 1989 in Adelaide, Australia) is an Australian footballer.

Career
Doyle grew up playing junior football in Bunbury before moving to England aged 16 to join Stoke City's youth academy. After not managing to break into the first team at Stoke, Doyle joined Greek Third Division side Niki Volos. On 20 June 2008, Doyle returned to Australia to join Perth Glory, the club he had supported since he was a young boy. He debuted for Perth Glory 17 August 2008 in a 1–0 loss against Adelaide United in the 2008-2009 A-League season.

In 2011, he signed Oakleigh Cannons in the Victorian Premier League.

Trivia
While at Stoke City in 2006, Doyle featured in Australia's Football Documentary The Away Game.

References

External links
 Perth Glory profile
 Oz Football profile

1989 births
Living people
Australian soccer players
Australian expatriate soccer players
A-League Men players
National Premier Leagues players
Croydon Kings players
Perth Glory FC players
Stoke City F.C. players
Soccer players from Adelaide
Oakleigh Cannons FC players
Association football defenders